Chuckchucha is a village in the Nicobar district of Andaman and Nicobar Islands, India. It is located in the Car Nicobar tehsil.
The headquarters of the island's central tribal cooperative society 'Ellon Hinengo Limited'(EHL) was established here in 1945. The society was started by the Jadwet family of Burma (Myanmar).

Demographics 

According to the 2011 census of India, Chuckchucha has 231 households. The effective literacy rate (i.e. the literacy rate of population excluding children aged 6 and below) is 74.23%.

References 

Villages in Car Nicobar tehsil